The Shady Grove Delmar Church and School is a historic church and school building in rural Carroll County, Arkansas, US. The building, a single story wood-frame structure with a gable roof, weatherboard siding, and a distinctive hexagonal tower with belfry and cupola. The building was built c. 1880 to provide a space for both religious services and a district school. It is a virtually unaltered example of the type, which was once common in rural Arkansas.

The building was listed on the National Register of Historic Places in 2015.

See also
National Register of Historic Places listings in Carroll County, Arkansas

References

Churches on the National Register of Historic Places in Arkansas
School buildings on the National Register of Historic Places in Arkansas
Greek Revival church buildings in Arkansas
Churches completed in 1880
Wooden churches in Arkansas
National Register of Historic Places in Carroll County, Arkansas
1880 establishments in Arkansas
One-room schoolhouses in Arkansas